Nine Elms railway station in the London district of Battersea was opened on 21 May 1838 as the London terminus of the London and Southampton Railway which on the same day became the London and South Western Railway. The building in the neoclassical style was designed by Sir William Tite. The station was inconveniently situated for travel to central London, with the necessity to complete the journey by road or by the steam boats connecting the station to points between Vauxhall and London Bridge.

The station was closed to passengers from 11 July 1848 when the L&SWR opened its metropolitan extension, the Nine Elms to Waterloo Viaduct from Nine Elms to Waterloo (then called Waterloo Bridge Station), and the area adjacent to the station housed the L&SWR's carriage and wagon works until their relocation to Eastleigh in 1909. After closure to passengers the station and surrounding tracks continued in use for goods traffic. 

In 1941 the building was damaged by German bombs and it was demolished in the 1960s. The station closed as a freight depot on 29 July 1968. The site became the flower section of the New Covent Garden Market in 1974.

Gallery

References 

Railway stations in Great Britain opened in 1838
Railway stations in Great Britain closed in 1848
Disused railway stations in the London Borough of Wandsworth
Former buildings and structures in the London Borough of Wandsworth
Former London and South Western Railway stations
William Tite railway stations
Nine Elms